Acacia cuneifolia is a shrub belonging to the genus Acacia and the subgenus Phyllodineae endemic to south western parts of Australia.

Description
The evergreen phyllodes are variably shaped but most often cuneate to oblong-cuneate. It blooms from July to October and produces yellow flowers. The simple inflorescences occur in groups of one to six per axil and have spherical flower-heads with a diameter of  containing 23 to 26 golden flowers.

Distribution
It is native to an area in the Wheatbelt region of Western Australia from York in the north to Williams in the south where it is found on hills, among granite outcrops and along stony watercourses growing in sandy-clay-loamy soils.

See also
List of Acacia species

References

cuneifolia
Acacias of Western Australia
Taxa named by Bruce Maslin
Plants described in 1999